Naraden Arena is an arena in Nara, Nara, Japan. It is the home arena of the Bambitious Nara of the B.League, Japan's professional basketball league.

References

Bambitious Nara
Basketball venues in Japan
Rohto Pharmaceutical
Indoor arenas in Japan
Sports venues in Nara Prefecture
Buildings and structures in Nara, Nara
Sports venues completed in 1972
1972 establishments in Japan